New Generation University College is a private college in Ethiopia. Founded by Ethiopian to provide private higher education opportunities for students in Ethiopia, NGUC has branches in Addis Ababa (አዱ ገነት), and Nekemte and Mettu towns in Oromia. It is one of the growing new private colleges in the country. New Generation also have branches in a neighboring countries like Somaliland, and have a big campus in Hargiesa. Many children of African and east European Embassy employees' in the Addis Ababa diplomatic community attend NGUC. The Vision of the New Generation University College (NGUC) as a 'Center for Excellence' was born out of the dynamic ideas and the desire to assist the national and regional endeavors to provide an adequate number of total quality higher education institutions.

Notable alumni and residents

 Dr. Negasso Gidada - Professor, Oromo politician and former Ethiopian president
 Temesgen Zewdie - Opposition MP, leader of UDJ party

References 

Universities and colleges in Ethiopia

am:አዲስ አበባ ዩኒቨርስቲ
de:Universität Addis Abeba
Educational institutions established in 2002
2002 establishments in Ethiopia